Samuel Johnson Pugh (January 28, 1850 – April 17, 1922) was a U.S. Representative from Kentucky.

Born in Greenup County, Kentucky, Pugh moved with his parents to Lewis County in 1852. He attended Chandler's Select School, Rand's Academy, and Centre College, Danville, Kentucky.

He studied law and was admitted to the bar, commencing practice in Vanceburg, Kentucky.

He held the following positions:
City attorney, 1872–1873
Master commissioner of the circuit court, 1874–1880
County attorney, 1878–1886
County judge, 1886–1890
Delegate to the State constitutional convention, 1890–1891
State senator, 1893–1894

Pugh was elected November 6, 1894 as a Republican to the 54th, 55th, and 56th Congresses (March 4, 1895 – March 3, 1901).

He resumed the practice of law in Vanceburg, Kentucky and died there April 17, 1922. He was interred in Woodland Cemetery.

References

1850 births
1922 deaths
Centre College alumni
Kentucky lawyers
Republican Party Kentucky state senators
People from Greenup County, Kentucky
People from Vanceburg, Kentucky
Republican Party members of the United States House of Representatives from Kentucky
19th-century American lawyers